Campbell Pass is an infrequently used name for a heavily travelled crossing of the Continental Divide in west-central New Mexico. This broad, gentle mountain pass, located in McKinley County between Gallup and Grants, is the site of a settlement with the official but rather nonspecific name of Continental Divide. Nevertheless, the pass has great historical importance, being traversed by the original main line of the Atchison, Topeka and Santa Fe Railway (now the Southern Transcon of the BNSF Railway), later by the famous U.S. Route 66, and now by its successor, Interstate 40.

The origin of the name Campbell Pass is obscure, and it appears to be used mostly in connection with the railroad.

References 

Landforms of McKinley County, New Mexico
Rail mountain passes of the United States
Mountain passes of New Mexico